Peter Muster (born 28 May 1952) is a Swiss sprinter. He competed in the men's 200 metres at the 1976 Summer Olympics.

References

1952 births
Living people
Athletes (track and field) at the 1976 Summer Olympics
Swiss male sprinters
Olympic athletes of Switzerland
Place of birth missing (living people)